The 2020 UConn Huskies football team would have represented the University of Connecticut (UConn) in the 2020 NCAA Division I FBS football season. After competing since 2004 as a member of the Big East Conference / American Athletic Conference in college football, the Huskies were slated to compete as an independent in 2020. However, on August 5, the university canceled its football season, due to the COVID-19 pandemic. The Huskies would have been led by fourth-year head coach Randy Edsall and would have played their home games at Rentschler Field in East Hartford, Connecticut.

The New York Times columnist Kurt Streeter argued UConn was the “real” national champion of the 2020 season, claiming the Huskies deserve this designation for opting out of the 2020 season due to COVID-19.

Previous season

The Huskies finished the 2019 season 2–10, 0–8 in American Athletic Conference (AAC) play, to finish in last place in the East Division. The 2019 season was the Huskies' last as a member of the AAC.

Preseason
During the summer of 2020, UConn had six teams cancel games against the Huskies before the university canceled the rest of the remaining scheduled season. UConn became the first FBS program to cancel its entire schedule due to the COVID-19 pandemic. Below was the original schedule for the season.

Award watch lists
Listed in the order that they were released.

Roster
The 2020 roster if UConn had played for the 2020 season.

References

UConn
UConn Huskies football seasons
UConn Football